Haffouz is a town and commune in the Kairouan Governorate, Tunisia. As of 2004 it had a population of 8,225.

See also
List of cities in Tunisia

References

Populated places in Kairouan Governorate
Communes of Tunisia
Tunisia geography articles needing translation from French Wikipedia